Hamilton City may refer to:

Hamilton City, California, a community in the United States
Hamilton City, Wyoming, a ghost town in the United States, better known as Miner's Delight
Hamilton, New Zealand (Territorial Authority Hamilton City), New Zealand's fourth largest city
Hamilton City SC, a Canadian professional soccer club in the Canadian Soccer League.

See also
Hamilton (disambiguation)